Øyangen is a lake in Innlandet county, Norway. The  lake lies on the border of the municipalities of Øystre Slidre, Vestre Slidre, and Vang. The lake is regulated for hydroelectric power generation. It serves as a reservoir for the nearby Lomen power plant.

See also
List of lakes in Norway

References

Øystre Slidre
Vestre Slidre
Vang, Innlandet
Lakes of Innlandet